Ensay (Gaelic Easaigh) is a currently unpopulated and privately owned island in the Outer Hebrides of Scotland. The island lies in the Sound of Harris between the islands of Harris and Berneray. The name originates from the Old Norse for Ewe Island. It is nothing to do with the Gaelic for Jesus – "Iosa" – as sometimes stated.

Although the island has had no permanent population since the 1930s, it is still used for summer grazing. The small chapel of Christ Church is maintained and services are held biannually.  The island is classified by the National Records of Scotland as an inhabited island that "had no usual residents at the time of either the 2001 or 2011 censuses."

The island shows signs of Stone Age habitation, with a prominent standing stone. Ensay House (Taigh Easaigh) was built in the Edwardian period. This was the home of the Stewart family (of which Ed Stewart is a descendant); they used to own the island.

The town of Ensay in Victoria, Australia was named after this island by one of the early settlers, a Scotsman named Archibald Macleod.

Gallery

Notes and references

Islands of the Sound of Harris
Private islands of the United Kingdom